Visa requirements for Kosovan citizens are administrative entry restrictions by the authorities of other states placed on citizens of Republic of Kosovo.
, Kosovan citizens had visa-free visa on arrival or e-Visa access to 73 countries, ranking the Kosovan passport 72nd in terms of travel freedom according to the Henley Passport Index.

Visa requirements map

Visa requirements 
Visa requirements for holders of normal  passports traveling for tourist purposes:

Territories and disputed areas
Visa requirements for Kosovar citizens for visits to various territories, disputed areas, partially recognised countries and restricted zones:

See also
Visa policy of Kosovo
Kosovar passport
List of nationalities forbidden at border

Notes

References

Politics of Kosovo
Kosovo